| tries               = 
| top point scorer    = James Pritchard (Canada)(31 points)
| top try scorer      = Nemani Nadolo (Fiji)Fetu'u Vainikolo (Tonga)(3 tries)
| venue               = 
| attendance2         = 
| champions           = 
| count               = 
| runner-up           = 
| website             = IRB Pacific Nations Cup
| previous year       = 2012
| previous tournament = 2012 IRB Pacific Nations Cup
| next year           = 2014
| next tournament     = 2014 IRB Pacific Nations Cup
}}
The 2013 Pacific Nations Cup rugby union tournament was held between five national sides in the Pacific Region: Canada, Fiji, Japan, Tonga, and USA.

Samoa were the reigning champion after they defeated Fiji in the 2012 competition but took the year off to compete in a tournament with South Africa, Scotland and Italy in the South African Quadrangular Tournament. Meanwhile, with the demise of the Churchill Cup, Canada and United States joined this competition for the first time.

The tournament ran from 25 May to 23 June 2013. Five of the matches were held in Japan, three in Canada, one in the U.S., and one in Fiji.

As with previous years, the tournament was a round-robin where each team played each of the other teams once.  Four points were awarded for a win, two for a draw and none for a defeat.  There were also bonus points offered with one bonus point for scoring four or more tries in a match and one bonus point for losing by 7 points or less.

Table

Fixtures

Week 1

Week 2

Man of the Match:
Nemani Nadolo (Fiji)

Touch judges:
 Sam Tuidraki
 Mikea Rokodrakia

Week 3

Week 4

Week 5

Week 6

Week 7

Squads

Canada
Canada's 44-man squad for their Summer 2013 games, including the 2013 IRB Pacific Nations Cup, the June international against Ireland, and the two Rugby World Cup Qualifiers vs the United States.

Head Coach:  Kieran Crowley

Fiji
35-man extended Fiji squad for the 2013 IRB Pacific Nations Cup.

 Head Coach:  Inoke Male

Japan
Japanese 35-man squad for 2013 IRB Pacific Nations Cup and 2013 Welsh rugby union tour of Japan.

Head coach:  Eddie Jones
Caps updated: 13 May 2013

Tonga
28-man Tonga squad for the 2013 IRB Pacific Nations Cup, 10 non-travelling reserves were also named.

Non-travelling reserves

United States
Eagles squad 30-man training squad for the 2013 IRB Pacific Nations Cup.

 Head Coach:  Mike Tolkin

Statistics

Top points scorers

Top try scorers

See also

 2013 IRB Nations Cup
 2013 IRB Tbilisi Cup

References

External links
 IRB Pacific Nations Cup – from the IRB website (accessed 1 May 2012)

2013
2013 rugby union tournaments for national teams
2013 in Oceanian rugby union
2013 in American rugby union
2013 in Canadian rugby union
2013 in Fijian rugby union
2012–13 in Japanese rugby union
2013 in Tongan rugby union